Yana Rattigan (born Yana Stadnyk; 20 January 1987 in Lviv, Ukrainian SSR, USSR) is a Ukrainian born wrestler who competes internationally for Great Britain and England. She competed in the 2009 World Wrestling Championships finishing 5th in the 48 kg category and was 7th in the same weight category at the 2010 World Wrestling Championships. Her most notable performance came in the 2010 European Wrestling Championships where she won a silver medal, a feat repeated in 2013. She was  the first woman to win a medal at European championship level for Britain. In 2014, representing England she again won the silver medal at the 2014 Commonwealth Games.

Personal life
Rattigan's brother is Olympic medallist Andriy Stadnik. Her sister-in-law Mariya Stadnik competes in the same weight category as Rattigan and was world champion in 2009. Rattigan married fellow wrestler Leon Rattigan in 2010, and began competing officially under her married name in 2014.

References 

1987 births
Ukrainian female sport wrestlers
British female sport wrestlers
Living people
Ukrainian emigrants to the United Kingdom
Sportspeople from Lviv
Commonwealth Games silver medallists for England
Wrestlers at the 2014 Commonwealth Games
Commonwealth Games medallists in wrestling
European Games competitors for Great Britain
Wrestlers at the 2015 European Games
Medallists at the 2014 Commonwealth Games